Aechmea paniculigera is a plant species in the genus Aechmea. It grows in Colombia, Venezuela and Jamaica.

Description

The pools of water trapped at the base of its leaves are home to various creatures including young bromeliad crabs and damselflies.

References

paniculigera
Flora of Jamaica
Flora of Venezuela
Flora of Colombia
Plants described in 1788
Flora without expected TNC conservation status